The Tripp 30 is a sailboat that was designed by  American William H. Tripp Jr. as a racer-cruiser and first built in 1963.

Production
The design was built by Mechans Ltd in the United Kingdom and by Werkspoor in the Netherlands starting in 1963, with 30 boats completed. Seafarer Yachts also imported the boat into the United States.

The design's molds were later moved to the United Kingdom. The design was developed into the Santander 30 in 1966 and produced by Dock Plastics.

Design
The Tripp 30 is a recreational keelboat, built predominantly of fiberglass, with wood trim. It has a masthead sloop rig or optional yawl rig, with sitka spruce spars. The hull has a spooned raked stem; a raised counter, angled, transom; a keel-mounted rudder controlled by a tiller and a fixed modified long keel. It displaces  and carries  of lead ballast.

The boat is fitted with a Universal Atomic 4  gasoline engine for docking and maneuvering.

The design has sleeping accommodation for four people, with a double "V"-berth in the bow cabin and two straight settee berths in the main cabin. The galley is located on both sides of the companionway ladder. The galley is equipped with a two-burner stove to starboard and an ice box and sink to port. The head is located just aft of the bow cabin on the port side.

See also
List of sailing boat types

References

Keelboats
1960s sailboat type designs
Sailing yachts
Sailboat type designs by William H. Tripp Jr.
Sailboat types built by Mechans Ltd
Sailboat types built by Werkspoor